Palatial Crest is a building in Hong Kong. Build by Henderson Group, located at Hong Kong Mid-Levels West, 3 Seymour Road. It get the occupation permit at the December 2000.

Introduction
Palatial Crest is located in Hong Kong Mid-Levels West, near building Seymour. The residential have infrastructure and plenty of leisure space, an area of 12,000 square feet club house. Club house have swimming pool, children's leisure pool, Jacuzzi, sauna, steam room, fitness room, audio-visual room, children's play room, a ballroom, function room and multi-purpose playground. Total 192 units and 102 parking space. Manage by Hang Yick Properties Management Limited, the majority of the unit's area are about 973-1175 square feet, 3 bedrooms and 3 bathrooms. The ceiling of the unit are extra high, approximately 10'-4 ". The top floor penthouse are three to four bedrooms and two halls design. Each unit of the living room and master suite with floor to ceiling windows design.

References

Apartment buildings in Hong Kong